Siege of Rome may refer to:

 Siege of Rome (508 BC), by Clusium
 Siege of Rome (408), see Sack of Rome (410)
 Siege of Rome (409), see Sack of Rome (410)
 Siege of Rome (472), by Ricimer
 Siege of Rome (537–538), by the Ostrogoths
 Siege of Rome (546), by the Ostrogoths
 Siege of Rome (549–550), by the Ostrogoths
 Siege of Rome (756), by the Lombards under Aistulf
 Siege of Rome (1849), by the French

See also 

 Arab raid against Rome (846)
 Capture of Rome (1870), by the Kingdom of Italy
 Liberation of Rome (1944), by the Allies during World War II
 Fall of Rome (disambiguation)
 Sack of Rome (disambiguation)
 Battle of Rome (disambiguation)
 Battle for Rome (disambiguation)